Borboni is a surname. Notable people with the surname include:

 Matteo Borboni ( 1610–1689), Italian painter 
 Paola Borboni (1900–1995), Italian stage and film actress
 Pietro Carlo Borboni (1720–1773), Swiss architect